Shovi is a mountain climatic and health resort known for its carbonated water in the Oni Municipality of Racha-Lechkhumi and Kvemo Svaneti in Georgia. It is situated on the banks of the Chanchakhi River, a left tributary of the Rioni River. The resort faces the main ridge of the Greater Caucasus to the north, and the Shoda-Kedela Range to the south.

External links 
  Shovi website

Populated places in Oni Municipality
Resorts in Georgia (country)